The National Premier Leagues WA Women, also known as the NPL WA Women, is a soccer competition in Western Australia. The competition is conducted by Football West, the organising body in Western Australia. The league is a subdivision of the second tier National Premier Leagues Women's structure, which sits below the national W-League, it is the highest tier of local women's competition in Western Australia. The league was founded in 2020 in Western Australia, several years behind equivalent leagues in other states.

History

Women's First Division and Premier League
The first full season for women's teams in the Perth area took place in 1972, the year after a high-profile curtain-raiser for two women's teams prior to a major friendly between the WA Men's State team and Dynamo Moscow. The inaugural season saw a single six team league comprising teams form Swan Athletic (originally named Midland), Azzurri, Kwinana United, South Perth United, Balga, Sorrento with Swan Athletic winning the first ever WA Women's Division 1 title.

The First Division was eventually renamed the State Premier League with clubs being required to field both a first team and reserves team (open age). In the final year of the State Premier League (2019) the league comprised Northern Redbacks, Queens Park, Balcatta SC, Fremantle City, Football West NTC, and Stirling Panthers.

National Premier League
In late 2019 Football West called for applications for the a new NPL Women's competition to take the place of the existing State Premier League competition as the highest tier of local women's football in the state. At that time Western Australia was one of the two remaining states (along with Tasmania) yet to implement a local version of the National Premier League Women's competition with NSW being the first state to implement their NPL competition in 2013.

Eight teams were selected to form the new National Premier League Women Western Australia (NPLW WA) including three existing State Premier League clubs (Northern Redbacks, Balcatta, Fremantle City), the existing Football West National Training Centre (NTC) program team, two clubs from the women's second division (Subiaco AFC, Curtin University) and two clubs that would form brand new senior teams to compete in the NPLW WA (Murdoch University Melville, Perth SC).

Controversially Queens Park SC, a member of the first division from 1973 and winner of five Division 1 titles was not selected as one of the inaugural teams for the NPLW WA, with most of its team members moving to the newly formed Murdoch University Melville team.

The NPLW WA was formed with clubs being required to field both a first team and an U-23 which was later changed for the 2022 to be an U-21's team.

Relocations, mergers and name changes

Over the history of the Women's First Division, Premier League and NPLW teams have been subject to a number of name changes, relocations and mergers. The reasoning for many of the relocations and name changes stemmed from women's teams not being truly integrated into traditionally male dominated clubs often having to deal with poor conditions for training and games. Teams therefore would often move as a whole to a new clubs or location under a new name in order to improve conditions.

This movement of teams clouds the early historical record keeping due to modern day incarnation of clubs having descended directly from teams that held one or many other names.

 Perth RedStar FC / Northern Redbacks / Stirling Reds / Stirling Vasto / Morley Windmills
Perth Redstar came into existence from a merger between the Women's only Northern Redbacks SC and ECU Joondalup, prior to this Northern Redbacks had been subject to a number of name changes. Initially as Morley Windmills the club won two titles in 1991 and 1992 before becoming Stirling Vasto and winning two titles in 1994 and 1995, the club then changed name to Stirling Reds winning 3 titles in 1996, 1998 and 1999. After a merger with Sorrento the club became Northern Redbacks which it remained before playing its final game under that name when it won the 2022 NPLW Night Series Final.

 Balcatta Etna FC / Balcatta FC / Floreat
Balcatta Etna was formed in 1978 but changed its name in 1994 to Balcatta Soccer Club then later Balcatta Football Club before returning to their original name of Balcatta Etna FC. The Floreat Athena team that won the 2000 and 2002 Women's first division moved to Balcatta SC.

 Fremantle City FC / East Fremantle Tricolore / Fremantle United
Fremantle City was formed over the course of the 2017 and 2018 seasons through a merger between Fremantle United and Fremantle City.

Fremantle United had fielded many women's teams in various divisions over the years including the First Division winning their one and only title in 1997.

East Fremantle SC (formerly known as East Fremantle Tricolore SC) were a club that grew strong in women's football during the 90s. They had previously had two stints in the first division, from 2003 to 2012 followed by relegation to the second division followed by promotion back to the first division in 2016. The club missed out on a first division title in 2009 by goal difference only to Balcatta SC.

 Melville University Murdoch FC
Murdoch University and Melville City SC were separate entities with both clubs fielding teams that had previously competed in women's football. 
Murdoch Universities women's team folded in 2007 when they along with three other teams from the second division were promoted to the first division. The club won its only first division title in 2001 the last club outside of the big 4 (Balcatta, Northern Redbacks, Queens Park and Beckenham) to do so for 19 years until the start of the NPLW.
Melville City SC had previously competed in the first division from 2013 to 2017 making one Cup final during that time.
In 2017 both clubs merged to form Melville University Murdoch FC with the club being granted a spot in the newly formed NPL Women WA in 2020.

 UWA Nedlands FC / Nedlands SC / University of Western Australia SC (UWA SC) / University
Formed after a merger between neighbouring clubs Nedlands SC and University of Western Australia SC. University had existed since 1969 adopting the name common to all University of WA sports clubs of simply University given that at the time there was only one university (a motto that would go on to form their club song). As more University's were created in Perth the club changed name to the University of Western Australia Soccer Club and took this name up to the Premier League with them in 2007. 
Nedlands Soccer Club was a relatively young soccer club ironically playing its home games out of Charles Court Reserve, closer to the University of Western Australia than UWA SC's actual home ground in Mount Claremont. Nedlands SC's women's' team spent two unsuccessful years in the Premier Division between 2008 and 2009 before they merged with UWA SC. The clubs entered the 2010 season in the Premier League as UWA Nedlands SC.

 Subiaco AFC / Subiaco United / Subiaco City JSC / Curtin University Women's Soccer Club
Formed from a merger between Subiaco United and Subiaco City Junior Soccer Club. Prior to this Curtin University Women's Soccer Club had moved to Subiaco in 2001 to form the basis of the modern incarnation of Subiaco's women's teams.

 South West Phoenix FC
Bunbury club South West Phoenix changed their name in 2010 to Bunbury Forum Force due to a sponsorship deal with Bunbury Forum shopping centre. They have since reverted to their original name of South West Phoenix.

 Melville Alemannia - defunct
Alemannia was created in 1969 as the sporting arm of the Rhein-Donnau German Club in Myaree, changing its name later to Melville Alemannia. In 1976 the club was fielded its first team in the local women's competitions. In 1984 the club won the First Division Top 4 Cup and then followed this up in 1987 by winning their one and only First Division League title. Melville Alemannia played their games out of John Connell Reserve nearby to where Leeming Strikers now play their games.
 Ashfield Dynamos
Ashfield Dynamos was the original name of the current Ashfield Sports Club. For many years Ashfield had not fielded a team in women's competitions until they began again in the metropolitan leagues in 2019 after the Morley Windmills team moved to Ashfield.
 Ascot / Forrestfield United - defunct
Ascot are historically one of the most successful women's' club in WA having won 9 first division titles out of the first 15 years of the competition. Ascot the club disappeared as a stand-alone entity back in 1979 after they lost their home ground to baseball and agreed to merge with Kalamunda United SC and Manning Rovers to form Forrestfield United. It is unsure how closely the women's teams history is linked to the mens club as the Ascot name remained in existence until 1986.
 Swan Athletic
 Osborne Park Galeb - defunct
 Inglewood Kiev Eagles
 Stirling Cracovia

Clubs
The following 8 clubs competed in the National Premier Leagues WA Women's competition for the 2023 season.

Honours

League

References:

Cup Competitions
The Night Series competition was introduced by Football West (borrowed from the existing Night Series idea in the men's competition) as a pre-season competition played in the late afternoon or evenings by the premier league teams as an advertisement of the growing women's game in the 2000s. Various incarnations have seen teams included from the second division but eventually reverting to only including teams from the Premier League due to the gap in quality between the divisions. In 2022 Football West introduced both a Women's State League Night Series and a Women's Amateur League Night Series matching the different tiers of the game.

Cup competitions have been run irregularly in the history of women's football in WA, mostly due to a lack of numbers until the 90s which stopped a true all encompassing cup competition from being viable. Later on, the cup competitions saw regular withdrawals from teams in the lower divisions as scores tended towards double figures when drawn against teams in higher divisions. Now the competitions is exclusively for the NPLW and State League teams, with the lower-tier leagues having their own cup competition.

Coach of the Year
Records from the Women's Soccer of Western Australia don't list any records for a Coach of the Year award. Football West appear to have added this award approximately around 2011 and have presented this award ever since. Traditionally the award was given to the coach based on points given for games won, generally this would go to the coach of the league winning team, however in the case of the league being won on goal difference (and therefore the same number of wins), there were cases where the number of cup wins influenced the winner of coach of the year.
In 2021 Football West awarded a Male Coach of the Year and Female Coach of the Year, rather than an NPL-M and NPL-W coach of the year.

Player of the Year

Top Goalscorer (Golden Boot)

Goalkeeper of the Year

See also
 National Premier Leagues Western Australia

Notes

References

Women's soccer leagues in Australia